Teenage Mutant Ninja Turtles: Mutant Melee is a 2005 fighting video game developed by Konami. It is based on the 2003 Teenage Mutant Ninja Turtles animated series.

Plot
Though the game does not offer a main plot for the primary cast, Adventure Mode is the single-player option in which the player chooses a character to follow in a battle-to-battle style story with written synopsis between battles and tasks as they attempt to reach their ultimate goal.  The mode presents offshoot routes that allow you to choose different challenges and battles as you proceed.  

During progression, the player gathers token currency which can unlock extra content in the Library menu area.

Gameplay

Up to 22 playable characters can be unlocked. There are four game modes: In "Last Man Standing", the goal is to be the last living player. "Knock Out" challenges the player to KO the most players in a set time or to reach a set amount of KO first. The goal of "King of the Hill" is to get to a set number of points before the other players. To gain points, players must stand in the light beam that moves to set places on the map. Finally, the goal of "Keep Away" is to carry a chest to gain points. While carrying the chest, players are unable to attack and must run away from the other players or risk dropping the chest when hit.

References

External links
 

2005 video games
3D fighting games
Fighting games
GameCube games
Konami games
Multiplayer and single-player video games
PlayStation 2 games
RenderWare games
Mutant Melee
Video games developed in the United States
Video games set in New York City
Video games with cel-shaded animation
Windows games
Xbox games